Calliphora is a genus of blow flies, also known as bottle flies, found in most parts of the world, with the highest diversity in Australia. The most widespread species in North America area Calliphora livida, C. vicina, and C. vomitoria.

Calliphora, meaning "bearer of beauty", was first formally named in 1830 by Jean-Baptiste Robineau-Desvoidy. It is the type genus of the family Calliphoridae.

Description 
Adults of Calliphora have a grey or black thorax, the colour dulled by a heavy microtomentum. The abdomen is metallic blue (rarely purple or green) and sometimes also dulled by microtomentum. The suprasquamal ridge is bare or with inconspicuous fine setae only. The first flagellomere of the antenna is more than twice the length of the pedicel.

Larvae have two posterior spiracles with a thick and unbroken peritreme, and (like other Calliphoridae larvae) containing straight slits. There is an accessory sclerite between the mouth hooks, though this is not visible in whole larvae.

Species
Species in the genus Calliphora include:

References

Calliphoridae
Oestroidea genera
Taxa named by Jean-Baptiste Robineau-Desvoidy